The Cook County School District is a public school district in Cook County, Georgia, United States, based in Adel. It serves the communities of Adel, Cecil, Lenox, and Sparks.

Schools
The Cook County School District has two elementary schools, one middle school, and one high school.

Elementary schools
Cook Elementary School
Cook County Primary School

Middle school
Cook County Middle School

High school
Cook High School

References

External links

School districts in Georgia (U.S. state)
Education in Cook County, Georgia